PEXQ stands for a series of algorithms for the objective measuring of the perceived quality of communication channels and a software suite to use them.
In particular the algorithms are
 Perceptual Evaluation of Audio Quality (PEAQ) for audio quality of e.g. lossy audio codecs,
 Perceptual Evaluation of Video Quality (PEVQ) for video algorithms,
 Perceptual Evaluation of Speech Quality (PESQ) for speech transmissions and
 Perceptual Evaluation of Data-Download Quality (PEDQ) for data transfers.